Vultures Await is Centro-Matic's front man Will Johnson's second solo album.

Track listing 
 Catherine Dupree
 Just to Know What You’ve Been Dreaming
 Vultures Await
 Just Some Silence
 Sleep a While
 As Victims Would
 Closing Down My House
 On, Caledonia
 Your Bulldozer
 Thousand Other Parts
 Fly, My Sweet Dove
 Nothin’ But Godzilla

References

External links
Official site

Centro-Matic albums
2004 albums